HMS Tracker (BACV-6/D24) was a  that was built in the United States, but served in the Royal Navy during World War II.

Design and description

Propulsion was provided by two boilers connected to a steam turbine,  which drove one shaft giving .

Aircraft facilities were a small combined bridge/flight control on the starboard side, two aircraft lifts , one aircraft catapult and nine arrestor wires. Aircraft could be housed in the  hangar below the flight deck. Armament comprised: two 4"/50, 5"/38 or 5"/51 Dual Purpose guns in single mounts, sixteen 40 mm Bofors anti-aircraft guns in twin mounts and twenty 20 mm Oerlikon anti-aircraft cannons in single mounts. The ships had a maximum aircraft capacity of twenty-four which could be a mixture of Grumman Martlets, Vought F4U Corsairs or Hawker Sea Hurricane fighter aircraft and Fairey Swordfish or Grumman Avenger anti-submarine torpedo bombers.

History
Tracker was laid down 3 November 1941, under a Maritime Commission (MARCOM) contract, MC hull 233, by Seattle-Tacoma Shipbuilding in Tacoma, Washington. She was originally intended to be the 2nd replacement merchant ship Mormacmail for Moore-McCormack Lines, Inc., however, before completion, the vessel was purchased by the US Navy. In 1942, she was given the designation BACV-6 and converted into an escort carrier at Willamette Iron & Steel, Portland, Oregon. She was launched on 7 March 1942, and commissioned 31 January 1943; she was transferred to the Royal Navy and renamed HMS Tracker.

Tracker served as an escort during 1943–1944, for North Atlantic and Arctic convoys. She originally carried Swordfish torpedo-bombers and Seafire fighters of 816 Naval Air Squadron; in January 1944, switching to the Grumman Avengers and Grumman Wildcats of 846 Naval Air Squadron.

HMS Tracker continued operations despite stove-in bows until 12 June 1944. Thereafter, she was repaired and partially refitted in Liverpool, until 7 September 1944. On 8 December 1944, the ship sailed to the US to be used as an aircraft transport, and spent the remainder of the war ferrying aircraft and personnel in the Pacific.

In August 1945, she made a final trip to the UK, being returned to the US Navy in November 1945. She was sold in November 1946, and entered service as the merchant ship Corrientes, based in Argentina. She was scrapped in 1964.

Battle honours
1943 - 44 Atlantic
1944 Arctic
1944 Normandy

Notes

References

External links

 

Type C3-S-A1 ships of the Royal Navy
Ships built in Tacoma, Washington
1942 ships
Attacker-class escort carriers
World War II aircraft carriers of the United Kingdom